Texas Rising is a 2015 History Channel 10-hour television miniseries based on the Texas Revolution against Mexico and how the Texas Rangers were created. It is directed by Roland Joffé and premiered on May 25, 2015. The series stars Bill Paxton, Jeffrey Dean Morgan, Ray Liotta, Brendan Fraser, Olivier Martinez and Cynthia Addai-Robinson.

Premise
Opening Introduction: (narrator): 

Unlike most films or television series that focus on the Texas Revolution, Texas Rising does not center around the Battle of the Alamo and starts after its fall. The series focuses on General Sam Houston and the Texan Army as Santa Anna marches eastward to face finish off the Texans. Battles shown include the Goliad Massacre and the Battle of San Jacinto. There is also special focus on a company of Texas Rangers under Deaf Smith and Henry Karnes who serve as scouts for Sam Houston.

Production
Filming began around June 2014 in Durango, Mexico. The series is from A+E Studios and ITV Studios America, produced by Thinkfactory Media with Leslie Greif as executive producer. Actor Jeffrey Dean Morgan ate a can of tuna a day to lose 40 pounds for his role  as Deaf Smith.

Release
The first teaser trailer was released on January 25, 2015, during Sons of Liberty, which revealed a "Memorial Day" release date and featured the tagline, "The Alamo wasn't the end. It was the beginning."

The series premiered in Australia on 19 August 2015 on FX Australia.

Cast

Texas Revolution

Texas Rangers

Other main characters

Recurring characters

Episodes

Reception

Ratings

Critical response
The media coverage about the series was somewhat negative, with some debate over whether or not the right blend between historical accuracy and poetic license had been reached - with some sources saying that a channel calling itself "History" invited greater scrutiny on the question. Review aggregator Rotten Tomatoes gives the miniseries a rating of 13% based on 15 reviews,  with an average rating of 5.1/10. The site's consensus states, "Tedious and forgettable, Texas Rising is full of offensive stereotypes and a messy multitude of unfocused characters and narratives." Metacritic gives the miniseries a score of 52 out of 100, based on 12 reviews, indicating "mixed reviews".

Days before the show aired, the Associated Press' Lynn Elber wrote that, inspired by the success of the series "Hatfields & McCoys" and "The Bible", History channel lined up several impressive elements for the Texas Rising series. Including shooting it in wide-screen CinemaScope and hiring Oscar-nominated Roland Joffe, "armies of extras [for use] in sprawling battle scenes, and getting Kris Kristofferson, George Strait and Jose Feliciano to add their own music along with the full symphonic score. Elber reported that executive producer Leslie Greif stated that "We wanted to try to tell the story from a lot of perspectives, so there are really no villains in our piece. There are villainous deeds. ... but we didn't want to have a paintbrush and say this side is right and this side is wrong." Greif also said that "The film was vetted by experts but does take liberties for dramatic purposes". He explained "Historically, the battles that occurred were true. We didn't kill anyone who didn't die and didn't keep anyone alive who died (among the real-life figures). The rest we used as a jumping-off spot to tell a great story." With this approach to the historical material Greif's concern was that too many people would miss all the work "spent perfecting each visual and sound element" because they would watch it on a laptop or smartphone, and he felt it best viewed in a darkened room on as big a screen as possible.

In a review Variety columnist Brian Lowry held that the show was "wonderfully cast and otherwise completely wooden". He maintained that it "juggles too many indifferently written, tough-talkin' characters, as if "Lonesome Dove" had experienced a sharp blow to the head." Lowry held that the series did not live up to the level of History channel's previous series "Hatfields & McCoys". Lowry did hold that the concept of trying to fill in the gap for audiences of what happened after the Alamo was a good one, but that the series was unable to do so effectively. He held a major flaw was "the wholly one-dimensional way the Mexican are depicted and that the portrayal of Santa Anna invoked memories of the cartoon Snidely Whiplash and the character The Most Interesting Man in the World from the Dos Equis advertising campaign. Lowry held that the show "pays more attention to the marketing campaign than the script".

The Washington Post reported that the series seemed more concerned with portraying those fighting for Texas's independence as if they were in John Wayne's 1960 film "The Alamo" rather than addressing the complexity of the actual historical events. An approach one might not suspect from a channel that is named "History". The Post held that it was "a love letter to the Lone Star State that some critics say broadcasts conservative politics and punctures History’s educational veneer." The Post noted that "History" channel did offer other perspectives "including those of Mexicans, Native Americans and slaves" on the website created for the show but "some of these views didn't seem to make it into Texas Rising." The Post pointed out that Houston had been a former spokesman for Cherokee Indians and was the only Southern governor to resist secession and felt the series not exploring this aspect of his story was "a missed opportunity".

Others also criticized the series appearing on History for being "lousy history", including Alamo Historian at Texas State University Jesus de la Teja, who told reporters for WOAI news radio the series was "playing fast and loose with the facts" and that "It over simplifies and it misrepresents ... trivializing and commercializing history." De la Teja pointed out that it plays up sex and has explosions "which could not have possibly happened with the military technology that was in place in the 1830s." De la Teja pointed out that the series makes use of the semi-legendary character Emily D. West about whom almost nothing is known. He regretted that because of the series on "History" people might confuse Hollywood for history.

The New York Daily News held that the show rekindled the excitement of the "Hatfields and McCoys", once you can identify all the players in the drama. They held that Jeffrey Dean Morgan, Olivier Martinez, and Cynthia Addai-Robinson gave standout performances. They recognized that some inaccuracies were included but even though "There’s doubtless some dramatic license here. No matter. It’s a classic campfire story, from a land that truly was the Wild West."

Brian Moylan of The Guardian was very critical of the series, complaining that the pacing was off with few battle scenes and too many shots of "dudes hanging around in grubby-looking clothing in front of tents talking about how awful Mexicans and Comanches are ... [and] a lot of dithering and boring discussion of military tactics". Despite this he did hold that it would appeal to the fans of History channel's "Hatfields and McCoys and "The Bible" because it displayed "libertarian and conservative sensibilities". He considered the other series superior to Texas Rising criticising this series for "atrocious dialogue, poor characterization and mechanical acting" by comparison. Moylan held that the writing was bad as it failed to develop characters: "none of the characters exude any sort of individuality at all. In fact, by the end of the first two hours, you will hardly know anyone’s name, their place in the hierarchy, or their contributions to the cause." And scenes attempting to establish character "are so heavy-handed that they will render more eye-rolls than engagement." Moylan also felt that the series suffered by lacking any "post-colonial reflection ... in the great scope of history. The line between good guys and bad guys is drawn as simply and thoughtlessly as it is in a backyard game of Cowboys and Indians." He held that his final verdict of the show was that it was "just dreadfully boring." On the positive side, Moylan viewed Adam Hicks' and Dillon Lane's performances as outstanding and also held that the "costumes, sets, and period details seem authentic and well rendered ... you don’t doubt the period setting for a second."

The Inquisitr praised the series holding that due to the many dramatic representations of the fight itself the "focus on the aftermath of the 'Battle of the Alamo' was a brave one, and probably the best decision. Persons who were important to the Texas Revolution outside of that event will get their chance to shine." They also held that "the historical inaccuracies" were "a problem that’s rather unavoidable". The Inquisitr held that complaints about the series' location backgrounds were unreasonable. Pointing out that Texas as a whole and San Antonio in particular does not look today like it did in the 1800s. The "landscape forever altered" - the city has "cars, paved roads ... [and] a population of nearly 27 million people".  The Inquisitr admitted that the series had inaccuracies "such as [what] Texans believed about slavery prior to the Civil War and whether or not Sam Houston would have had a one night stand with the Yellow Rose of Texas." But held that the series should be viewed as within the genre of Historical fiction. They maintained that it was unlikely "made with the intent of being 100 percent true to the times or the characters". They concluded that "it would be impossible for a well-produced and entertaining series to leave a unique mark on viewers by interpreting events exactly as history experts would want. Sometimes you have to shut up and suspend disbelief to enjoy something. Texas Rising is meant to be entertaining and educational ... but mostly entertaining."

The New York Times criticized the pacing of the series saying "a story that seems as if it should be characterized by adventure and derring-do instead is often as flat and drab as a Western plain." They expressed surprise that director Roland Joffé was only able to create "a disjointed collection of clichés, often staged with the clumsiness of bad community theater." The Times held that the writing reduced Houston to a character which "has no magnetism" and made Santa Anna into "something of a repellent caricature". The Times held that by having no depth in the opposition that the Texan heroes were facing, the series seemed trite "The good guys — the Texans — are good, and the bad guys are reductive figures who exist to be hated. ... Native American warriors gallop and whoop; Mexican soldiers and generals enjoy cockfights, executions and all things vile." They also complained that the dialogue was "truly awful" with characters speaking "in sound bites rather than convincing conversation". The Times held that some good performances could be found if one overlooks the drawbacks, singling out Liotta, Fraser, and Jeremy Davies' work in the series. The Times also praised the music video done for the series by Kris Kristofferson, (who appears as Andrew Jackson in the series), doing a cover of Tom Petty's "I Won't Back Down."

Awards and nominations

Won
New York Festivals
 Gold World Medal - Night 3 and 4

Golden Reel Awards
 Best Sound Editing - Long Form Sound Effects and Foley in Television 

Nominations
Emmy Awards:
 Outstanding Sound Mixing For A Limited Series Or A Movie - "Night 4"
 Outstanding Sound Editing For A Limited Series, Movie Or A Special - "Night 4"
 Outstanding Original Main Title Theme Music

Online Film & Television Association Awards
 Best Costume Design in a Non-Series
 Best Visual Effects in a Non-Series

Screen Actors Guild Awards
 Best Male Actor in a TV movie/miniseries - Ray Liotta

Women's Image Network Awards:
 Best Actress in a Drama Series - Cynthia Addai-Robinson

Golden Reel Awards
 Best Sound Editing - Long Form Dialogue and ADR in Television

International Film Music Critics Association
 Best Original Score for a Television Series

References

External links
 
 
 

2010s American television miniseries
History (American TV channel) original programming
Television shows set in Texas
War films based on actual events
Texas Revolution films
Cockfighting in film
Films about the Texas Ranger Division
Television shows filmed in Mexico